In numerical analysis, stochastic tunneling (STUN) is an approach to global optimization based on the Monte Carlo method-sampling of the function to be objective minimized in which the function is nonlinearly transformed to allow for easier tunneling among regions containing function minima. Easier tunneling allows for faster exploration of sample space and faster convergence to a good solution.

Idea 

The acceptance probability  of such a trial jump is in most cases chosen to be
 (Metropolis criterion) with an appropriate parameter .

The general idea of STUN is to circumvent the slow dynamics of ill-shaped energy functions that one encounters for example in spin glasses by tunneling through such barriers.

This goal is achieved by Monte Carlo sampling of a
transformed function that lacks this slow dynamics. In the "standard-form"
the transformation reads  where 
is the lowest function value found so far. This transformation preserves the loci of the minima.

The effect of such a transformation is shown in the graph.

Dynamically adaptive stochastic tunneling 

A variation on always tunneling is to do so only when trapped at a local minimum.  is then adjusted to tunnel out of the minimum and pursue a more globally optimum solution. Detrended fluctuation analysis is the recommended way of determining if trapped at a local minimum.

Other approaches 
 Simulated annealing
 Parallel tempering
 Genetic algorithm
 Differential evolution

References 
 
 
 
 
 

Stochastic optimization